Shah Alam (known as Guddu Jamali) is an Indian politician and a member of the 16th and 17th Legislative Assembly of Uttar Pradesh of India. He represents the Mubarakpur constituency of Uttar Pradesh and is a member of the Bahujan Samaj Party and a close associate of BSP Supremo Mayawati.

Early life and education
Shah Alam was born in Azamgarh, Uttar Pradesh. He holds a Master of Arts degree.

Political career
Shah Alam has been a MLA. He represented the Mubarakpur constituency and is a member of the Bahujan Samaj Party. He left BSP to join Samajwadi Party before the 2022 Uttar Pradesh Legislative Assembly election but when he wasn't made the candidate from Mubarakpur he joined All India Majlis-e-Ittehadul Muslimeen and got a ticket from Mubarakpur. Jamali left AIMIM on 27th of March 2022 and rejoined Bahujan Samaj Party most probably for being the party's candidate for the Azamgarh (Lok Sabha constituency) by-polls due to Akhilesh Yadav vacating the seat to become the leader of the opposition in the Uttar Pradesh Legislative Assembly.

Positions held

See also
Azamgarh
Politics of India
Sixteenth Legislative Assembly of Uttar Pradesh
Uttar Pradesh Legislative Assembly

References 

Bahujan Samaj Party politicians from Uttar Pradesh
Uttar Pradesh MLAs 2012–2017
Politicians from Azamgarh district
1973 births
Living people
Jamia Millia Islamia alumni